Thomas Bell Sweeney Jr. (Nov. 18, 1903 – September 9, 1973), was a Republican politician from the state of West Virginia.

He was born in Wheeling, Ohio County, West Virginia, on November 18, 1903. His father Thomas Bell Sweeney was the Wheeling agent of the Equitable Life Assurance society, and lived in Washington, D.C. after 1911. His grandfather was John F. Sweeney, who had founded that agency in 1887 and managed it for seven years before his death. His great-grandfather Thomas Sweeney (glassmaker) was a prominent early industrialist in Wheeling and served in both houses of the Virginia General Assembly as a Whig. His grandfather was admitted to the Sons of the American Revolution in 1949, based on the service of his ancestors John Bell and his son Robert Bell in  the Cumberland County, Pennsylvania militia in that conflict.

He was a member of the West Virginia Senate 1st District, 1939–42. He was at various times also a candidate for West Virginia House of Delegates, U.S. Senator from West Virginia, and U.S. Representative from West Virginia. He was also a delegate to the Republican National Convention from West Virginia in 1948, 1956, and 1960.

References

External links 

1903 births
American Presbyterians
1973 deaths
Republican Party West Virginia state senators
Politicians from Wheeling, West Virginia
20th-century American politicians